The Kelimyar (Kelimeer) is a river in Yakutia (Sakha Republic), Russia.

The river flows north of the Arctic Circle across a desolate area of Bulunsky District devoid of settlements. The nearest inhabited places are Taymylyr, located downstream from its confluence with the Olenyok, and Sklad (Tyumyati), located a little upstream.

History
In 1875, during his third Siberian expedition, Alexander Chekanovsky intended to "go along the banks of the Lena to the mouth and, if possible, then go to the mouth of the Olenyok from the Laptev Sea." 

He explored inland from the deep and wide lower course of the Eyekit, and then along the rocky and mountainous watershed area lying between the Lena and the Olenyok, descending along the Kelimyar river to the Olenyok. From the Kelimyar he traced the course of the Olenyok to its mouth.

Course  
The Kelimyar is a right tributary of the Olenyok. Its sources are in a small lake of the western slopes of the Chekanovsky Ridge. It flows first in a roughly southern direction in its upper course, then it bends northwestwards heading in that direction within a low floodplain with marshes and many small lakes.

Owing to the harshness of the climate the river is frozen between early October and early June.

Tributaries

See also
List of rivers of Russia

References

External links 
Fishing & Tourism in Yakutia
Biofacies Analysis of Lower and Middle Jurassic Deposits of Siberia on Palynomorphs - map of the sections studied. (1) Kelimyar River
ATA24.Taimen. Olenek River and its tributaries

Rivers of the Sakha Republic
Central Siberian Plateau
Tributaries of the Olenyok